Monkey Marsh Lock is a lock on the Kennet and Avon Canal, at Thatcham, Berkshire, England.

Monkey Marsh Lock was built between 1718 and 1723 under the supervision of the engineer John Hore of Newbury. The canal is administered by Canal & River Trust. The lock has a rise/fall of 8 ft 8 in (2.64 m).

One of only two remaining working examples of turf sided locks on the canal (the other being Garston Lock) of more than a dozen originally, Monkey Marsh Lock is listed as an ancient monument by English Heritage

References

External links

Heale's Lock to Newbury on tonycanalpics.co.uk

See also

Locks on the Kennet and Avon Canal

Locks on the Kennet and Avon Canal
Locks of Berkshire
Scheduled monuments in Berkshire